"My Hands" is a song recorded by British singer-songwriter Leona Lewis for her second studio album Echo (2009). It was written by Arnthor Birgisson and Ina Wroldsen and produced by the former. Alongside Birgisson, Lewis was involved with the song's vocal production. Lyrically, it is about life after the end of a relationship. The strings were performed by Urban Soul Orchestra, who were led by Simon Fischer.

"My Hands" was selected as the official theme song for the English version of the video game Final Fantasy XIII. Lewis decided to accept the offer of her track being used as she felt as though she was connected with the video game's female protagonist, Lightning. The song garnered a mixed response from music critics, who described it as forgettable, despite noting that Lewis performs the song undeniably well. In March 2010, "My Hands" debuted on the UK Singles Chart at number 145.

Background and production
"My Hands" was recorded for Lewis's second studio album, Echo, which was released in November 2009. It was written by Arnthor Birgisson and Ina Wroldsen, and produced by Birgisson. Both Lewis's vocals and the instrumentation for the track were recorded by Seth Waldmann at Conway Recording Studios in Los Angeles, California, United States, Dean Street Studios in London, England and The Vault in Stockholm, Sweden. Birgisson and Lewis carried the vocal production. The strings were performed by Urban Soul Orchestra, who were led by Simon Fischer; they were arranged and conducted by Stephen Hussey.

Additionally, the strings were recorded and engineered by Rich Cooper at British Groove Studios in London. All guitars were provided for by Esbjörn Öhrwal, while the choir was organised and arranged by Lawrence Johnson. The vocals performed by the choir were recorded by Neil Tucker at Metropolis Studios in London. "My Hands" was mixed by Manny Marroquin at Larrabee Studios in Universal City, California; he was assisted in the process by Christian Plata and Erik Madrid. Stephem Simmonds contributed background vocals.

Composition and critical reception
It is composed in the key of D major using common time and is 80 beats per minute. Andy Gill for The Independent listed it as one of the top four tracks to download from Echo, along with "Happy", "Lost Then Found" and "Brave". A reviewer for CBBC's Newsround labelled the song, along with another track from the album called "Broken", as "pretty forgettable." The reviewer continued to write that although Lewis's performs the songs undeniably well, they do not stand out compared to "Happy" and "I Got You". Michael Cragg for musicOMH wrote that the chorus of "My Hands" "erupts" and "bludgeons the listener into submission" and that its meaning becomes overshadowed.

Usage in media
"My Hands" was selected as the official theme song for the trailer of Final Fantasy XIII. As part of promotion for the video games release, Lewis recorded a promotional advert for Square Enix (the video game's developer and publisher) and spoke about how she was happy to have been approached about the use of "My Hands" on the trailer and that it had some personal meaning. She said: "I'm thrilled to be collaborating with Square Enix on such a groundbreaking game. I never would have imagined 'My Hands' as such a perfect fit for Final Fantasy XIII, but the strong female protagonist struck a chord with me and I can't wait to see Lightning do her thing".

Track listing
Standard edition
 "My Hands" – 

United States standard version
 "My Hands" –

Credits and personnel
Recording
Recorded at Conway Recording Studios, Los Angeles, California, United States; Dean Street Studios, London, England and The Vault, Stockholm, Sweden.
Choir vocals recorded at Metropolis Studios, London, England.
Mixed at Larrabee Studios, Universal City, California, United States.

Personnel

Lead vocals – Leona Lewis
Background vocals – Stephen Simmonds
Songwriting – Arnthor Birgisson, Ina Wroldsen
Production – Arnthor Birgisson
Vocal recording – Seth Waldmann (Lewis), Neil Tucker (Choir)
Vocal production – Arnthor Birgisson, Leona Lewis

Mixing – Manny Marroquin
Assistant mixing – Christian Plata, Erik Madrid
Strings – Urban Soul Orchestra
Strings arranger and conductor – Stephen Hussey
All guitars – Esbjörn Öhrwal
Choir organiser and arranger – Lawrence Johnson

Credits adapted from the liner notes of Echo.

Charts
Five months after the release of Echo, "My Hands" debuted at number 145 on the UK Singles Chart on 20 March 2010.

References

2009 songs
Final Fantasy music
Leona Lewis songs
Songs written by Arnthor Birgisson
Songs written by Ina Wroldsen
Video game theme songs